John Vernon Trathen,  MBE was Archdeacon of Kroonstad from 1968 to 1973.

Trathen served in the RNVR during World War II. He was ordained in 1962. After a  curacy in Bloemfontein he held incumbencies at Springfontein, Harrismith and Parkview.

References

Archdeacons of Maritzburg
20th-century South African Anglican priests
Members of the Order of the British Empire
Royal Naval Volunteer Reserve personnel of World War II